Justin Forst (born 21 February 2003) is an Austrian professional footballer who plays as a striker for Tirol.

Career
Forst is a youth product of the academies of Innsbrucker SK, SV Innsbruck and AKA Tirol. He began his senior career with SV Innsbruck in 2018. On 9 June 2021, Forst transferred to Tirol. He made his professional debut with Tirol in a 2–2 Austrian Football Bundesliga tie with Hartberg on 17 October 2021.

International career
Forst is a youth international for Austria, having represented the Austria U19s at the 2022 UEFA European Under-19 Championship.

References

External links
 
 OEFB Profile

2003 births
Living people
Sportspeople from Innsbruck
Footballers from Tyrol (state)
Austrian footballers
Austria international footballers
WSG Tirol players
Austrian Football Bundesliga players
2. Liga (Austria) players
Austrian Regionalliga players
Association football forwards